Benetti is an Italian shipbuilding and boat building company based in Viareggio, Livorno, and Fano, owned by Azimut.

Benetti designs and constructs motoryachts, and is one of the leading builders of custom superyachts, having won the Showboats International magazine "shipyard number 1" award six times in a row, the only yard to have done so.

History
Founded in 1873, when Lorenzo Benetti (1844–1914), bought the Darsena Luca shipyard to found the Benetti shipyard. The yard built commercial vessels, including fishing boats and Mediterranean trading ships. On his death in 1914, his sons Gino and Emilio took over, and renamed the yard Fratelli Benetti. They continued using wooden construction, but now built ocean-going ships, and some private yachts. After the death of Gino in 1927, his sons Giuseppe and Virgilio took over his share, while Maurizio and Bertani assisted their father Emilio.

World War II
During World War II, the yard built medium-sized military vessels in steel, but due to highly effective bombing, the production was severely limited. After the war, and with restrictions on Italy on what she could produce militarily, the yard produced the first steel-hulled diesel powered vessel in the locality, the "Raphaelo". In 1954, Fratelli Benetti split its sailing and yacht business (Gino's family), from the commercial ship building business which continues under the name M&B Benetti (Emilio's family). Emilio has a holding in both companies, and chairs both companies.

In 1963, Emilio died and the running of Fratelli Benetti was taken over by Gusieppe and his son Lorenzo. Lorenzo was the driver of the yacht business, moving instantly from wooden to steel construction, and designing three styles of yacht which brought the name Benetti to the world: the Delfino, the Tirreno and the Meditteraneo lines (from 18 to 33 metres). Demand for these vessels outstripped the capabilities of the yard. In 1978, the yard launched the "Viano", a sailing yacht which on corrected times won the Admirals Cup. In 1979, the yard launches "Nabila" for Adnan Khashoggi, which at 83 metres and 2,465 tonnes was the largest yacht of its time.

Sale to Azimut
Lorenzo died in 1980 and the company fell into financial difficulties until 1984, when it was purchased by Paolo Vitelli, the owner of Azimut, who renamed it Benetti Shipyard. In 1988, Benetti built a ship to challenge for the transatlantic Blue Riband award but its efforts proved unsuccessful. The company is now part of the Azimut I Benetti group, also owner of Fraser Yachts.

Shipyards

Viareggio shipyard
In 2003 was acquired the area of the SEC yard which went bankrupt in the previous years in order to expand the production.

Fano shipyard
The yard has a 60 m wharf in the port.

Livorno shipyard

Azimut-Benetti acquired the Cantiere navale fratelli Orlando in 2003 when the Livorno yard was in severe economic difficulties. The old shipyard has been partially demolished to make space for a residential and commercial area named Porta a Mare (Gate to sea), the part toward the entrance of the harbour was transformed with the construction of six huge sheds were to laid down the yachts. The Morosini slip was dismantled and was erected a Marina where to berth the yachts built. Benetti Livorno shipyard has a covered area of 30,000 sq m, a production area of 28,000 sq m, an open area of 130,000 sq m and a total area of 190,000 sq m.

Benetti models

Benetti Tradition is model of traditional yachts built by Benetti Yard. With fiberglass hull sizes up to 99 feet, powered by the Caterpillar C18 the maximum speed of Benetti Tradition 99 is 15 knots.

Benetti Classic is a classical yacht, with a style very similar to those of Benetti Tradition but with a larger hull size. With fiberglass hull sizes up to 143feet, powered by the Caterpillar C30 with higher power of 1,650 hp (each), the maximum speed of Benetti Classic is 16 knots.

Benetti Vision is a more modern style yacht with large measurements up to 143 feet. The beauty of this yacht is in the whole atmosphere and nice shape and exterior. Benetti Vision has two main engines of Caterpillar 3508B, with maximum power of 1,300 hp (each). This gives the yacht a maximum speed of 15 knots. This is a slightly less than Benetti Classic series, but with lower fuel consumption. The yacht is very beautiful designed interior with equipment for watersports and fishing.

Benetti FB is the last series. This is the manufacturer's first series of luxury yachts. Some of the names of the yachts built by Benetti in the series FB are called Amnesia, I Dinasty, Wind, Alibella and many more. All of these yachts are from the highest level of luxury, comfort and expenses.

In May 2010, Benetti yachts announced Benetti imagination, which is first super yacht from Benetti's new 47 meter line. Imagination is designed by Stefano Natucci and Francois Zuretti.

In 2011 the company delivered a "Benetti Vision 145"—their 16th. It had a specification of 390 tons fully loaded.

In 2015, Benetti partnered with Henrik Fisker to launch new series of 164 ft super yachts called Benetti Fisker 50.

Superyachts 
Benetti built hundreds of yachts over the years. Below is a list of selected Benetti yachts:

Clients

Benetti have built super yachts for many customers, including:
Nabila for Adnan Khashoggi
Galkynyş for the government of Turkmenistan, to be used as a Presidential yacht by Gurbanguly Berdimuhamedow
Reverie for Kjell Inge Røkke
Lionheart for the Monaco based British retail entrepreneur Philip Green
”Illusion V” now owned by the Mata family and also available for charter.

See also

 Rossinavi
 List of Italian companies
 List of large sailing yachts

References

External links

 Official homepage
 BBC News Photo tour of the Benetti factory

Manufacturing companies established in 1873
Italian companies established in 1873
Companies based in Tuscany
Companies based in le Marche
Yacht building companies
Shipbuilding companies of Italy
Italian boat builders
Italian brands
Viareggio
Livorno
Fano